Niamot Sheikh (Bengali: নিয়ামত শেখ) is an Indian Bengali businessman and politician from the state of West Bengal. He is a current member of the West Bengal Legislative Assembly from the Hariharpara (Vidhan Sabha constituency), Murshidabad.

References 

West Bengal MLAs 2016–2021
Living people
Trinamool Congress politicians from West Bengal
Year of birth missing (living people)